The F3 Derby is an association football rivalry between Central Coast Mariners and Newcastle Jets. It is the longest standing derby in the A-League Men. The rivalry originated due to the team's relative geographical proximity, with the Mariners located on the Central Coast of New South Wales, the Jets in Newcastle, immediately to the north. The two clubs were also the only two clubs from outside capital cities in the inaugural A-League seasons, which contributed to the rivalry.

The teams first met in the Australian qualifying tournament for the 2005 OFC Club Championship, in what was the Mariners' first ever competitive game (the Jets having formed five years prior). Both sides have played in all seventeen seasons of the A-League, and the teams also met on occasion in the now-defunct A-League Pre-Season Challenge Cup. The rivalry was particularly strong in the 2007–08 A-League, where the teams occupied the top two positions in both the A-League regular season and its finals series. The teams have played a total of 60 times in league and cup matches since 2005, of which Central Coast have won 22, Newcastle have won 19, and 19 have been drawn.

The derby is named after the former name of the Pacific Motorway, which connects the two cities. The name has been retained despite the Motorway now being officially known as the M1.

History of the rivalry

Early meetings
In November 2004, the clubs to participate in the newly formed A-League competition were announced by Football Federation Australia. They included former National Soccer League club Newcastle Jets (previously known as Newcastle United) and Central Coast Mariners, the only regional club included in the new tournament. With no more than one club in any city in the inaugural competition, the F3 derby was the only local rivalry in the inaugural seasons of the A-League.

The teams first met in a qualification match for the 2005 OFC Club Championship. The Mariners won the match in a penalty shootout, after the game finished scoreless. The rivalry quickly became heated when the Mariners' Nik Mrdja broke Newcastle defender Andrew Durante's leg in a tackle late in the match.

Top of the league: 2007–08
In the 2007–08 A-League, both teams had very strong seasons. The Mariners won their first A-League Premiership on goal difference from the Jets after winning on the final weekend of the competition. As a result, the Mariners were drawn against the Jets in the major semi-final – the winner over two legs to progress to the 2008 A-League Grand Final, the loser to play in the preliminary final in order to qualify for the Grand Final. In the first match, goals from Adam and Joel Griffiths gave the Jets a two-goal lead, the Mariners held scoreless after a missed penalty from striker John Aloisi. However, the Mariners turned the tie around in the second leg, winning 3–0 in extra time led by two goals from Sasho Petrovski to qualify for the Grand Final. Nonetheless, Newcastle qualified for the Final a week later, beating Adelaide United to ensure that the 2008 A-League Grand Final would be an F3 derby.

The 2008 A-League Grand Final was held at the Sydney Football Stadium, despite the Mariners having earned the right to host the game, due to the ground's higher seating capacity than Central Coast Stadium. The Jets took the lead midway through the second half, with Mark Bridge (who? It was definitely Griffo) scoring after capitalising on an error from Mariners defender Tony Vidmar, playing his final game before retirement. There was significant controversy with only minutes remaining when Newcastle midfielder James Holland made contact with his arm on the ball in his own penalty area. Despite appeals from Mariners players, referee Mark Shield did not award a penalty kick and Newcastle held on to win the match, winning their first A-League Championship. In the aftermath of this decision, Mariners goalkeeper Danny Vukovic struck Shield on the arm, and was shown a red card for his actions. He was subsequently suspended for multiple months, and, despite an initially successful appeal, not permitted to compete at the 2008 Summer Olympics. The attendance of 36,354 remains the Mariners highest home crowd of all time.

In 2013, the F3 was renamed as the M1, however, the derby is still officially referred to as the F3 derby.

In December 2022, the clubs unveiled a trophy given to the team with the better record in the derby meetings over the season. The trophy consisted of a core drill sample of the motorway.

Records and statistics

By competition

This table only includes competitive first-team games, excluding all pre-season games and friendlies.

Full list of results
Score lists home team first.

Statistics

Results
 Highest-scoring game: 
10 goals, Central Coast Mariners 2–8 Newcastle Jets (A-League, 14 April 2018)
 Largest winning margin:
 6 goals, Central Coast Mariners 2–8 Newcastle Jets (A-League, 14 April 2018)

Trends
 Most consecutive wins: 5, Newcastle Jets (7 October 2017 – 23 January 2019)
 Longest undefeated run: 9, Central Coast Mariners (8 December 2012 – 14 November 2015)
 Most consecutive draws: 3, (30 November 2014 – 14 November 2015)
 Most consecutive games without a draw: 7, (7 October 2017 – 16 March 2019)
 Most games played against each other in a season: 6 (twice), 2005–06, 2007–08
 Record highest attendance: 36,354. 24 February 2008, Sydney Football Stadium. Central Coast Mariners 0–1 Newcastle Jets
 Record lowest attendance: 2,373. 24 July 2020, Central Coast Stadium. Central Coast Mariners 0–0 Newcastle Jets (restricted number of spectators due to COVID-19 pandemic).
 Record appearance-maker: John Hutchinson (31), Central Coast Mariners. Played his first on 7 May 2005 and his thirty-first on 30 November 2014.
 Record goalscorer: Matt Simon (9), Central Coast Mariners. Scored his first on 15 August 2008 and his ninth on 15 May 2021.

Crossing the divide
26 players have played for both Central Coast and Newcastle. The first player to play for both clubs was Noel Spencer, debuting for Newcastle in 2007 after making his Central Coast debut in 2005. Sam Silvera is the only player to have played for both clubs to have returned to his original club afterwards, returning to Central Coast in 2022 after his stint with Newcastle.

In the January transfer window of the 2022-23 season, the two clubs executed a swap deal, seeing James McGarry cross from the Jets to the Mariners and Thomas Aquilina go in the opposite direction from the Mariners to the Jets.

Statistics are sourced from ALeagueStats.com and updated as of 8 February 2023.

Central Coast, then Newcastle

Newcastle, then Central Coast

Managers and coaches
No manager has managed both clubs, however, there have been some staff members to be involved with both clubs. Wayne O'Sullivan played for Central Coast from 2005 to 2007. In 2009, O'Sullivan became coach of Newcastle's women's team. In 2014, he returned to the Mariners as an assistant to head coach Phil Moss. Damien Brown played for Newcastle in the National Soccer League before playing for the Mariners and later moving into an off-field role. Jess Vanstrattan played for the Mariners before becoming goalkeeping coach at the Central Coast Mariners Academy, later joining the Jets in 2015 as a goalkeeping coach and occasional reserve goalkeeper.

See also
List of association football club rivalries by country
Sports rivalry
Nationalism and sport

References

Australian soccer rivalries
Soccer in New South Wales
Newcastle Jets FC
Central Coast Mariners FC

pl:Mecze derbowe w A-League